GPO may refer to:

Government and politics 
 General Post Office, Dublin
 General Post Office, in Britain
 Social Security Government Pension Offset, a provision reducing benefits
 Government Pharmaceutical Organization, a Thai state enterprise
 Government Press Office (Israel)
 Green Party of Ontario, Canada
 United States Government Publishing Office
 Group Purchasing Organization

Places
 Gospel Oak railway station, in London, England
 Guam Premier Outlets, a shopping mall in Guam
 Indore G.P.O., a residential area in Indore, India
 General Pico Airport, in Argentina, IATA code

Science and technology
 Giant Pacific Octopus
 Group Policy Object
 General Purpose Outlet, mains socket in Australia
 General Purpose Output, an uncommitted digital signal pin on an integrated circuit or electronic circuit board used as an output and controllable by the user at runtime.

Other uses 
 Generalplan Ost, a Nazi genocide plan in occupied territories
 General Post Office (disambiguation)
 Group purchasing organization
 Gun Position Officer, usually a lieutenant, responsible for the technical control of an artillery battery in the United Kingdom and Commonwealth forces 

 Grand Piece Online, a Roblox videogame based on One Piece